Raimondo Carnera (2 February 1915 – 2002) was a Danish fencer. He competed in the individual and team épée and sabre events at the 1952 Summer Olympics.

Raimondo Carnera was a cousin to the Italian heavyweight boxer and world champion Primo Carnera.

References

1915 births
2002 deaths
Danish male fencers
Olympic fencers of Denmark
Fencers at the 1952 Summer Olympics
Sportspeople from Copenhagen